Sofulu is a village in the Sarıçam, Adana Province, Turkey.

References

Villages in Sarıçam District